RMR may refer to:
 RMR layout (of an automobile), see rear mid-engine, rear-wheel-drive layout
Recife Metropolitan Region in Northeastern Brazil
 Recurring Monthly Revenue, a measure of customer attrition
 Registered Merit Reporter, a certification offered by the National Court Reporters Association
 Resting metabolic rate, see basal metabolic rate
 Revelstoke Mountain Resort, a Canadian ski resort located in Revelstoke, British Columbia
 Rock mass rating, a rock mass classification system (geotechnical engineering)
 RockMyRun, a running/workout mobile app
 Royal Marines Reserve, the volunteer reserve force used to augment the regular Royal Marines
 The Royal Montreal Regiment, a Canadian Forces infantry regiment based in Montreal
 Rick Mercer Report, a Canadian comedy television series
 Ruggedized miniature reflex (optics), a type of weapon-mounted red dot sight for guns
 Robust mouse rejuvenation, rejuvenating an elderly mouse so that its remaining life expectancy is doubled
 RMR (revolver), a .357 double-action revolver
 RMR (singer), an American singer and rapper